Oclemena acuminata, commonly known as whorled wood aster, is a plant native to eastern North America. Its range extends from Newfoundland to Georgia.

References 

Astereae
Flora of the Northeastern United States
Flora of Eastern Canada
Flora without expected TNC conservation status